The Dong-Feng 11 (a.k.a. M-11, CSS-7) is a short-range ballistic missile developed by the People's Republic of China.

History 
The DF-11 is a road-mobile short-range ballistic missile (SRBM) which began development in 1984 as the M-11, of which was led by the China Sanjiang Space Group (previously known as Base 066). It entered service with the PLA Second Artillery Corps in 1992.

Description 
The DF-11 has range of 300 km with an 800 kg payload. An improved DF-11A version has increased range of >825 km. The range of the M-11 does not violate the limits set by the Missile Technology Control Regime (MTCR). Unlike previous Chinese ballistic missiles, the DF-11 use solid fuel, which greatly reduces launch preparation time (15-30 min). Liquid-fueled missiles such as the DF-5 require up to 2 hours of pre-launch preparation. The upgraded DF-11B has been revealed as well. Estimates on the number of DF-11s in service vary between 500 and 600. The launch vehicle is made by Wanshan Special Vehicle. A bunker buster variant with improved accuracy called the "DF-11AZT" has also been revealed.

See also 
 Sky Spear

References

External links
 Sinodefense description

Ballistic missiles of the People's Republic of China
Weapons of the People's Republic of China
Short-range ballistic missiles
Military equipment introduced in the 1990s
it:Dongfeng#Dongfeng 11 (CSS-7)
pl:Dongfeng (pocisk)#Dongfeng 11 (CSS-7)
ru:Дунфэн (ракета)#Дунфэн 11 (CSS-7)